Chelis wagneri is a moth in the family Erebidae. It was described by Püngeler in 1918. It is found in central Tien Shan, a mountain range in Central Asia.

This species was moved from the genus Palearctia to Chelis as a result of phylogenetic research published in 2016.

References

Moths described in 1918
Arctiina